The Box Canyon Site is a prehistoric archaeological site in Hidalgo County, New Mexico. The site was occupied during the Animas phase (1200–1350); some artifacts may also date from the Salado phase (1350–1450) The principal feature of the site is an adobe house mound containing more than 100 rooms. A 1962 excavation explored 18 of the rooms; artifacts recovered from the investigation include ceramics, stone and metal flakes, and some cobbles.

The site was added to the National Register of Historic Places on Jan. 28, 1993.

See also

National Register of Historic Places listings in Hidalgo County, New Mexico

References

Archaeological sites on the National Register of Historic Places in New Mexico
Hidalgo County, New Mexico
Adobe buildings and structures in New Mexico
National Register of Historic Places in Hidalgo County, New Mexico